The 2001 Clarion Sandown 500 was an Australian motor race for Sports and Production Cars which drew its entries from those competing in the Australian Nations Cup Championship and Australian GT Production Car Championship. It was the first Sandown 500 held since the former touring car endurance race was revived for production cars.

The race, which was the 34th Sandown 500 endurance race was held at Sandown Raceway in Melbourne, Victoria, Australia over the weekend of 15 September 2001.

Classes
Cars competed in four classes: 
 Nations Cup
 GT Production Class A
 GT Production Class B
 GT Production Class C

Budweiser Top Gun Challenge
After qualifying was completed the fastest ten cars competed in a one-lap runoff for the top ten grid positions. Runoff results as follows:

Official results
Cars failing to complete 75% of winner's distance marked as Not Classified (NC). Race results as follows:

Statistics
 Provisional Pole Position - #666 Paul Stokell - 1:16.4012
 Pole Position - #43 Jim Richards - 1:16.9760
 Fastest Lap - #7 D'arcy Russell - 1:17.7024
 Race Average Speed - 143.22 km/h

References

External links
Images from the 2001 Clarion Sandown 500 Retrieved from web.archive.org on 19 January 2009

Clarion Sandown 500
Motorsport at Sandown
September 2000 sports events in Australia